Columbia-Tusculum is the oldest neighborhood in Cincinnati, Ohio, and is located on the East Side of the city. The population was 1,523 at the 2020 census.

Demographics

Source - City of Cincinnati Statistical Database. 
Note - boundaries of neighborhood changed in 2010 - reflective of population decrease.

History
Columbia was founded in 1788 on the Little Miami River and predates Losantiville (which became Cincinnati) by a month. The first Protestant church (Baptist) in the Northwest Territory was erected in Columbia. The Cincinnati area's first school opened here in 1790. Many of the early settlers are buried in the former Columbia Baptist Cemetery, founded in 1790. The cemetery is now known as the Pioneer Memorial Cemetery.

In 1791, Columbia became part of Columbia Township. From the early 1840s, it was included in Spencer Township, until Cincinnati annexed it in 1871. Tusculum was annexed in 1875.

The neighborhood is noted for its Victorian era homes decorated in the painted ladies multi-color style. Designated historic structures in the neighborhood include the Bates Building, Kellogg House, LuNeack House, Norwell Residence, Spencer Township Hall, and the Stephen Decker Rowhouse.

Further reading

References

External links
Columbia-Tusculum Neighborhood Site

Neighborhoods in Cincinnati
Historic districts in Ohio
Populated places established in 1788
1788 establishments in the Northwest Territory